Iremadze is a Georgian surname. Notable people with the surname include:
Tengiz Iremadze (born 1973), Georgian philosopher
Zurab Iremadze (1960–2004), Georgian military commander 

Surnames of Georgian origin
Georgian-language surnames